In five-dimensional geometry, a cantellated 5-simplex is a convex uniform 5-polytope, being a cantellation of the regular 5-simplex.

There are unique 4 degrees of cantellation for the 5-simplex, including truncations.

Cantellated 5-simplex

The cantellated 5-simplex has 60 vertices, 240 edges, 290 faces (200 triangles and 90 squares), 135 cells (30 tetrahedra, 30 octahedra, 15 cuboctahedra and 60 triangular prisms), and 27 4-faces (6 cantellated 5-cell, 6 rectified 5-cells, and 15 tetrahedral prisms).

Alternate names 
 Cantellated hexateron
 Small rhombated hexateron (Acronym: sarx) (Jonathan Bowers)

Coordinates 

The vertices of the cantellated 5-simplex can be most simply constructed on a hyperplane in 6-space as permutations of (0,0,0,1,1,2) or of (0,1,1,2,2,2). These represent positive orthant facets of the cantellated hexacross and bicantellated hexeract respectively.

Images

Bicantellated 5-simplex

Alternate names 
 Bicantellated hexateron
 Small birhombated dodecateron (Acronym: sibrid) (Jonathan Bowers)

Coordinates 
The coordinates can be made in 6-space, as 90 permutations of:
 (0,0,1,1,2,2)

This construction exists as one of 64 orthant facets of the bicantellated 6-orthoplex.

Images

Cantitruncated 5-simplex

Alternate names 
 Cantitruncated hexateron
 Great rhombated hexateron (Acronym: garx) (Jonathan Bowers)

Coordinates 
The vertices of the cantitruncated 5-simplex can be most simply constructed on a hyperplane in 6-space as permutations of (0,0,0,1,2,3) or of (0,1,2,3,3,3). These construction can be seen as facets of the cantitruncated 6-orthoplex or bicantitruncated 6-cube respectively.

Images

Bicantitruncated 5-simplex

Alternate names 
 Bicantitruncated hexateron
 Great birhombated dodecateron (Acronym: gibrid) (Jonathan Bowers)

Coordinates 

The coordinates can be made in 6-space, as 180 permutations of:
 (0,0,1,2,3,3)

This construction exists as one of 64 orthant facets of the bicantitruncated 6-orthoplex.

Images

Related uniform 5-polytopes 
The cantellated 5-simplex is one of 19 uniform 5-polytopes based on the [3,3,3,3] Coxeter group, all shown here in A5 Coxeter plane orthographic projections. (Vertices are colored by projection overlap order, red, orange, yellow, green, cyan, blue, purple having progressively more vertices)

Notes

References 
 H.S.M. Coxeter: 
 H.S.M. Coxeter, Regular Polytopes, 3rd Edition, Dover New York, 1973 
 Kaleidoscopes: Selected Writings of H.S.M. Coxeter, edited by F. Arthur Sherk, Peter McMullen, Anthony C. Thompson, Asia Ivic Weiss, Wiley-Interscience Publication, 1995,  
 (Paper 22) H.S.M. Coxeter, Regular and Semi Regular Polytopes I, [Math. Zeit. 46 (1940) 380-407, MR 2,10]
 (Paper 23) H.S.M. Coxeter, Regular and Semi-Regular Polytopes II, [Math. Zeit. 188 (1985) 559-591]
 (Paper 24) H.S.M. Coxeter, Regular and Semi-Regular Polytopes III, [Math. Zeit. 200 (1988) 3-45]
 Norman Johnson Uniform Polytopes, Manuscript (1991)
 N.W. Johnson: The Theory of Uniform Polytopes and Honeycombs, Ph.D. 
  x3o3x3o3o - sarx, o3x3o3x3o - sibrid, x3x3x3o3o - garx, o3x3x3x3o - gibrid

External links 
 
 Polytopes of Various Dimensions, Jonathan Bowers
 Multi-dimensional Glossary

5-polytopes